Pondok Indah is an upscale residential area in Kebayoran Lama, South Jakarta, Indonesia. Dubbed the Beverly Hills of Indonesia,  this is a much sought-after suburb by expatriates, conglomerates, celebrities, and government officials. This area was built by the Metropolitan Kentjana Group in the 70s into the most prestigious and complete residential complex and commercial area in Indonesia.  Houses in this suburb can run upwards to millions of U.S. dollars.

Many mansions in the area comprise one to three floors, with designated quarters for household staff. Many of the larger mansions are inhabited by wealthy Indonesians. The 'Jakarta Post' estimates that 74.5% of residents in Pondok Indah are expatriates, following their annual survey of Indonesia. (Jakarta Post, issue 6 edition 21, January 6, 2007) A posh shopping complex, Pondok Indah Mall, caters to residents.

History

Crops plantation 
Far from being elite as it is today, Pondok Indah was previously a dry field, rice fields, plantations, and a vast expanse of rubber and secondary crops plantations.

At one point, the area was visited by an architect and urban developer, Ciputra. At that time, Ciputra had to pass through a small road that was only 6 meters wide and in the form of a cobblestone road to reach the area that would become the forerunner of Pondok Indah, now the small road in the form of rocks has become Jalan Radio Dalam Raya.

According to Ciputra, the plantation area is very strategic, because it is bordered by Jalan Ciputat Raya (which was previously part of the National Road from Jakarta to Bogor that passed through Palmerah, Ciputat and Parung) to the west and Lebak Bulus to the south. The most important thing is because the plantation area is located close to the Kebayoran Baru Satellite City, the first modern satellite city in Indonesia. Another thing is because the plantation area is not a flood-prone area and the soil does not contain salt like in the northern region of Jakarta. The area is also still a stretch of mild forest and a source of clean water.

Construction Realization 
To turn the plantation into an elite residence, Ciputra took businessman Liem Sioe Liong. Even though at that time, Liem Sioe Liong wanted to develop the Sunter area, North Jakarta. However, Ciputra assesses that the area that is actually developing is in South Jakarta because the soil and air quality are still good. Meanwhile, the Sunter area has poor soil and air quality.

After listening to Ciputra's presentation, Liem also agreed to work together to finance the Pondok Pinang project. Liem gave the loan and borrowed the rest from Bank Dagang Negara (which became the forerunner of Bank Mandiri) with a recommendation from Liem Sioe Liong and a project guarantee. He said:

The Naming of Pondok Indah 
The area is named "Pondok Indah". According to Ciputra, the name of the pondok refers to the area name in the area, namely Pondok Pinang.  Literally, pondok means residence or house.  Thus, if the word cottage is combined with the word beautiful, it will mean "beautiful house".  The name Pondok Indah is in accordance with Ciputra's wishes as the most luxurious residence in Jakarta.

Early construction 
After preparing the legal entity and the masterplan, Ciputra and his colleagues started building the Pondok Indah area which was previously a plantation starting in the 1970s.The first project to be completed was the construction of a road in accordance with the mapping of plots that had been made and the construction of a waterway.

At the beginning of construction, some houses were only built as examples.  The rest, Ciputra sells lots.  This is based on the behavior of elites who want to build their own house according to their desire (as shown in the poster). Even so, Ciputra also opened a request if there was a buyer who wanted to build his house.

Ciputra was worried because the funds spent to acquire land and build road infrastructure and waterways were enormous. To work around this, Ciputra and his team built tiny houses north of Pondok Indah, precisely on Jalan Pinang Perak, Jalan Pinang Emas. The house turned out to sell quickly. On the other hand, the plots were also invaded by buyers. He said that almost every weekend the Pondok Indah area, which is still in the form of plots, is visited by interested parties.  Most interested people are people who have been rich for a long time, and new rich people who have emerged as a result of business activity.

Facilities

Education 
This area is served by many schools such as follows:
 Jakarta Intercultural School Pondok Indah Campus
 Bakti Mulya 400
 Tirta Marta BPK Penabur
 Don Bosco
 Raffles Christian School
 SDI Harapan Ibu
 HighScope Indonesia, Pondok Indah

Health 
 Pondok Indah Hospital

Shopping Mall 

Pondok Indah Mall (PIM) is located at the north side of Pondok Indah and becomes the largest and popular shopping mall in Jakarta. The mall is divided into four parts

 PIM 1 (opened in 1991)
 PIM 2 (opened in 2005)
 Street Gallery (opened in 2013)
 PIM 3 (opened in 2021)

Pondok Indah Mall is also directly connected with TransJakarta Corridor 8 on the Pondok Indah 2 BRT Station.

Sports 
 Pondok Indah Golf Course – The golf venue of the 1983 Golf World Cup and the 2018 Asian Games.

Religious 

 Pondok Indah Grand Mosque

Diplomatic 

  Embassy of Cuba

Access 
Before this area began to be built, the only road access to the forerunner of Pondok Indah was Jalan Radio Dalam Raya, which at that time was only a small road and rocks. The road connects the forerunner of Pondok Indah with the first modern satellite city in Indonesia, Kebayoran Baru.

In the first phase of construction, Ciputra and his partners started the construction of the main road and road plots first, according to the master plan that had been prepared. The main road to the Pondok Indah area is named Jalan Metro Pondok Indah, connecting the Kebayoran Lama area with Lebak Bulus which previously had to pass through Jalan Ciputat Raya (which was previously part of the National Road from Jakarta to Bogor which passed Palmerah, Ciputat and Parung, before it was replaced by Jalan Metro Pondok Indah).

Pondok Indah also have an access from the TMII–Pondok Pinang section of the Jakarta Outer Ring Road which was first opened in 1995.

Transportation

Bus Routes

TransJakarta 

 Corridor  (Lebak Bulus–Harmoni Sentral), with two BRT stations:
 Pondok Indah 1
 Pondok Indah 2

Other Buses 

 Kopaja
 S13 AC: Ragunan Belakang - Grogol (via Metro Pondok Indah - PIM - Arteri Pondok Indah)
 B86: Lebak Bulus - Kota (via Metro Pondok Indah - PIM - Arteri Pondok Indah)
 MetroMini
 S72: Blok M - Lebak Bulus (via Metro Pondok Indah - PIM)
 S79: Blok M - Lebak Bulus (via Metro Pondok Indah - Terogong)
 Kowanbisata
 T512: Pulo Gadung - Ciputat (via Metro Pondok Indah - PIM - Arteri Pondok Indah)
 Koantas Bima
 P102: Tanah Abang - Ciputat (via Metro Pondok Indah - PIM)
 Mayasari Bakti
 AC73: Kampung Rambutan - Ciledug (via Metro Pondok Indah - PIM - Arteri Pondok Indah)
 PPD
 P21: Blok M - Ciputat (via Metro Pondok Indah - PIM - Lebak Bulus)

Train lines 

  North–South Line of the Jakarta MRT, with one station:
 Lebak Bulus Grab

Recreation

There are many malls located inside and near Pondok Indah. Pondok Indah Mall is the main attraction of the area as it is considered as a big shopping mall in Jakarta. Next to the mall is a water park and a golf course. There are also multiple tennis courts for residents to use.

The Pondok Indah Golf and Country Club was also the venue of the 1983 Golf World Cup.

Pondok Indah Sunday Market (PISM) offers a break from Sunday routines. The market serves the various interests of residents in the area (food, children activities, shopping, medical information, live music), as well as the meeting point for sports enthusiasts and exotic vehicle lovers. It is held annually in January. Visitors to PISM 2017 are estimated upwards of 10,000 people. Proceeds from organizing the bazaar is wholly donated to community charity projects throughout the year. The group works with Kelurahan Pondok Pinang to identify needs in the community, and often donates through RPTRA Pondok Pinang.

Notes

References

South Jakarta
Planned townships in Indonesia